Center School might refer to:
The Center School (Manhattan), a middle school in Manhattan
The Center School (Seattle, Washington), a high school in Seattle
Center School (Brookfield, Connecticut), an elementary school in Connecticut
Center School (Omaha, Nebraska), a registered historical site in Nebraska
Center School (Indiana), a one-room schoolhouse in Indiana